In the Chicago mayoral election of 1901, Democrat Carter Harrison Jr. was reelected to a third term, defeating Republican candidate Elbridge Hanecy by a 9.5% margin of victory.	

The election took place on April 2. Until 2019, no subsequent election had more candidates running on its ballot.

Ahead of the election, there were competitive races to receive the two major party's nominations at their municipal nominating conventions. Mayor Harrison was challenged for the Democratic Party nomination by former governor John Peter Altgeld. However, Altgeld was politically weaker than he once had been, and Harrison easily fended him off. In the March primary to elect the delegate's to the city's nominating convention, delegates supporting Harrison won a broad majority, and Harrison won the party's nomination by acclamation at its nominating convention. The Republican Party had a large field of candidates seeking its nomination. Along with Elbridge Hanecy (who was a judge on the Circuit Court of Cook County, the two other front-running contenders for the Republican nomination were William Boldenweck and former alderman John Maynard Harlan. Other contenders that Henry beat were Judge Marcus Kavanaugh, Aldermen William Mavor, Frank T. Fowler, and former alderman Walter J. Raymer.

Nominations

Democratic
Incumbent mayor Carter Harrison Jr. was renominated by the Democratic Party.

Harrison's opponent for the nomination was former governor John Peter Altgeld, who had been a third-party challenger in the previous election. However, his 1901 candidacy for the nomination was not a serious threat to Harrison, as Altgeld had lost much of his influence over the last two years.

There had been rumors that, additionally, Roger Charles Sullivan and John Patrick Hopkins might recruit a candidate of their own to challenge Harrison, but this never materialized.

In the March primary to elect delegates to the city nominating convention, Harrison-supporting delegate candidates won a large majority. At the convention, Harrison was renominated by acclamation.

Republican
The Republican Party nominated Cook County Circuit Court judge Elbridge Hanecy at its city convention on March 2. He captured the nomination on the eighth round of balloting. Hancey had previously been an unsuccessful candidate for the Republican Illinois gubernatorial nomination in 1900.

Other candidates who sought the nomination were John Maynard Harlan, Judge Marcus Kavanaugh, Aldermen William Mavor, Frank T. Fowler, William Boldenweck, W. J. Raymer.

The top three contenders for the nomination were Hanecy, Harlan, and Boldenweck. Machine Republicans largely backed Hanecy. Independent Republicans largely backed Harlan. German Republicans largely backed Boldenweck.

Hanecy had been a judge on the Cook County Circuit Court for a number of years. The previous year, Hanecy had sought the gubernatorial nomination, being defeated by Richard Yates Jr. at the state convention by a thin margin. Hanecy was politically allied with William Lorimer, being Lorimer's candidate both in this mayoral election and in the previous year's gubernatorial election.

Despite speculation, Harlan denied any intentions of running as an independent if he lost the nomination.

Prohibition
The Prohibition Party nominated Avery E. Hoyt.

Single Tax
The Single Tax Party nominated Thomas Rhodes.

The Single Tax Party was a national organization. It championed Georgism.

Social Democratic
The Social Democratic Party nominated Guy Hoyt.

Socialist
The Socialist Party nominated John Collins.

Socialist Labor
The Socialist Labor Party nominated John R. Peptin.

General election
Henacy campaigned actively, delivering many speeches. Henacy aimed to present himself as a positive alternative to Harrison. He advocated changing the fee system practiced by some city officials and also proposed stronger measures to regulate the streetcar companies. However, his attempts to adopt reformist policies were weakened in their effectiveness by his association with William Lorimer. Reform-minded Republicans were upset that the seedy Lorimer managed to get his preferred candidate nominated by the Republican Party over reformist favorite John Maynard Harlan. Some Republicans unsuccessfully sought to persuade Harlan to run as an independent.

The Republican Party's platform criticized the Harrison administration as "inefficient", "notorious", "scandalous", "dishonest", and cowardly negligent in its, 
The traction issue surfaced in this election. The Democratic platform advocated for municipal ownership of street railways. The Democratic platform did not advocate for immediate public ownership, however, making provisions in its platform for the extension of franchises. The Democratic platform advocated for, Not only did Henacy propose stronger measures to regulate streetcar companies, but the Republican convention had declared that, 

The Democratic platform also advocated municipal ownership of other public utilities, including gas, electricity, and water.

Harrison took his Republican challenger serious, and campaigned vigorously against him.

Results
By the standards of the era in Chicago politics, Harrison's margin of victory was viewed as a decisive one.

Harrison carried 26 wards while Hanecy carried the remaining nine.

In some of the most Republican parts of the city, Hanecy only managed to win a plurality of the vote, and in others he lost the vote to Harrison. However, Harrison, likewise, suffered in some of the city's Democratic strongholds.

Harrison received 72.96% of the Polish-American vote, while Hanecy received 23.54% and Collins received 2.74%.

References

Mayoral elections in Chicago
Chicago
Chicago
1900s in Chicago